The 22929/30 Dahanu Road–Vadodara Superfast Express is a Superfast train belonging to Western Railway zone that runs between  and  in India. It is currently being operated with 22929/22930 train numbers on a daily basis.

Service

22929/Dahanu Road–Vadodara Superfast Express has an average speed of 55 km/hr and covers 273 km in 4 hrs 55 mins.
22930/Vadodara–Dahanu Road Superfast Express has an average speed of 58 km/hr and covers 273 km in 4 hrs 45 mins.

Route and halts 

The important halts of the train are:

Coach composition

The train has standard ICF rakes with max speed of 110 kmph. The train consists of 13 coaches:

 1 First Class Non-AC
 10 General Unreserved
 2 Seating cum Luggage Rake

Traction

Both trains are hauled by a Vadodara Loco Shed based WAP-5/4 electric locomotive from Dahanu Road to Vadodara Junction and vice versa.

See also 

 Dahanu Road railway station
 Vadodara Junction railway station

Notes

References

External links 

 22929/Dahanu Road–Vadodara Superfast Express India Rail Info
 22930/Vadodara–Dahanu Road Superfast Express India Rail Info

Transport in Vadodara
Express trains in India
Rail transport in Gujarat